Yanga is a genus of cicadas from Madagascar, Nosy Be and Pemba Island.

References

Platypleurini
Insects of Madagascar
Cicadidae genera
Taxa named by William Lucas Distant